Hollinwood tram stop is a tram stop and park & ride site on the Manchester Metrolink Oldham and Rochdale Line in Hollinwood, Greater Manchester, England. It was formerly a railway station before its conversion to a tram stop between 2009 and 2012.

History
Hollinwood railway station opened on 17 May 1880, situated in the Hollinwood area of the Metropolitan Borough of Oldham, in Greater Manchester, England.

The station was next to the M60 motorway Manchester Outer Ring Road which was constructed across part of the former station site. As a consequence of this the station was rebuilt by the Highways Agency in the 1990s.

The station closed for the conversion of the line to a Metrolink tram stop on 3 October 2009 and was rebuilt, reopening as Hollinwood tram stop on 13 June 2012.

Former railway service
After May 1995 Hollinwood was served by half-hourly trains from Manchester Victoria to Shaw & Crompton. Trains to  ran every half-hour but passed through Hollinwood without stopping. On Sundays there was an hourly service in each direction.

Service pattern

Connecting bus routes
Hollinwood station is served by First Greater Manchester service 149, which stops nearby on Tweedale Way and runs to Oldham via Coppice and to North Manchester General Hospital via Moston and Cheetham Hill. Stotts Tours service 151 stops at the other end of Tweedale Way with the 151 running to Hightown via Failsworth, Newton Heath and Cheetham Hill.

On Manchester Road, First services 83, 180 and 184 provide frequent buses between Manchester and Oldham with the 83 continuing to Sholver and the 180/184 running to Saddleworth plus Huddersfield (184), while First service X84 provides a peak-time express service to Manchester and Saddleworth. Stotts Tours service 159 runs to Oldham via Chadderton and Middleton via Failsworth, while Stotts service 396 runs to Ashton-under-Lyne via Hathershaw and to Newton Heath via Failsworth.

References

External links

Metrolink stop information
Hollinwood area map

Tram stops in the Metropolitan Borough of Oldham
Former Lancashire and Yorkshire Railway stations
Railway stations in Great Britain opened in 1880
Railway stations in Great Britain closed in 2009
Railway stations in Great Britain opened in 2012
Tram stops on the East Didsbury to Rochdale line
Chadderton